Seven and the Ragged Tiger is the third studio album by the English new wave band Duran Duran, released on 21 November 1983 through EMI and Capitol Records. Co-produced by Alex Sadkin, Ian Little and the band, recording sessions took place in France, the Caribbean and Australia between April and October 1983 following Duran Duran's decision to record outside the UK as tax exiles. Unlike their previous two studio albums, the sessions were marred by a lack of productivity and tensions rose between the band members over its direction.

Wanting a change in direction from their previous album Rio, Seven and the Ragged Tiger is a synth-pop and dance-driven record, with emphasis on synthesiser-based textures. The lyrics are ambiguous and cover a variety of topics; lead vocalist Simon Le Bon described the album as "an adventure story about a little commando team". The title refers to the five band members and their two managers; the "ragged tiger" meaning success. The cover artwork was shot at the State Library of New South Wales and designed by Malcolm Garrett.

The album received scathing critical reviews but was a commercial success, becoming the band's first and only UK number one album. It also charted at number eight in the US, eventually going double platinum. A remix of "The Reflex" by Nile Rodgers was a UK and US number one single. Duran Duran supported the album with a worldwide concert tour that yielded several concert films and a live album. It was the last studio album with the original lineup until 2004's Astronaut. In later decades, Seven and the Ragged Tiger has received mixed reactions, with critics finding weaker songwriting compared to their first two records. It was reissued by EMI in 2010.

Background
By the start of 1983, Duran Duran had established themselves as one of the biggest bands in the world. They received hate from the press and their musical peers but enjoyed commercial success following the release of Rio (1982): the non-album single "Is There Something I Should Know?" spent three weeks at number one in the United Kingdom in March 1983. Capitol Records also reissued the band's 1981 self-titled debut album in the United States with an updated sleeve photo and replacing "To the Shore" with the new single to capitalise on its success. Duran Duran underwent an exhaustive press tour and live performances from March to April before recording commenced on their third studio album.

Recording history

French sessions
At the decision of their managers, Paul and Michael Berrow, Duran Duran opted to spend a year away from the UK as tax exiles to avoid paying the very high tax rates successful British musicians were required to pay. To record their third studio album, the band moved into a three-story château in Valbonne, France on the Côte d'Azur in April 1983, installing a 24-track mobile studio that was rented from North London's RAK Studios. According to author Stephen Davis, the idea was for work to ensue amidst the lavender-scented hills above the city. They almost immediately attracted tabloid criticism. In an interview with The Times in 1995, bassist John Taylor stated:

 

Duran Duran escaped some of the large media hype surrounding them, which their photographer Denis O'Regan attributed to the château's relaxed atmosphere. The band had ended their partnership with Colin Thurston, the producer of their first two albums, so Ian Little, the co-producer of "Is There Something I Should Know?", was brought in to produce the sessions. At the château, the instruments were set up in a large empty room upstairs and wired to the recording equipment outside, forcing the musicians to travel back and forth in between takes to verify it was taping properly. The group spent three months working out demos and ideas. Like their previous albums, the rhythm tracks were recorded first, with lyrics written and taped at a later date.

The sessions began timidly but productivity quickly decreased due to a lack of new material; John said that all their material had been used up for the first two albums. The musicians were burned out, so creativity was at an all-time low. Little later verified that "nothing had been written in advance, so the biggest starting point they'd ever have would be another song". Workdays did not start until 4 p.m. due to the antics of the band members, particularly John, and only lasted a couple of hours. The musicians briefly went to Cannes to visit the music video set of Elton John's "I'm Still Standing", directed by Duran Duran's own video director Russell Mulcahy. On several occasions, the band members individually flew back to the UK for other commitments. Reflecting in his 2008 memoir, guitarist Andy Taylor stated that "it was the start of the megadamage" due to the acceleration of his and John's cocaine addictions.

Throughout the recording days, Duran Duran primarily wrote through jam sessions, receiving feedback from Little on which parts were worth developing further. The producer gave the band a songwriting method he had learned working with Roxy Music's Bryan Ferry and Phil Manzanera, wherein he would create a groove using a programmed drum with effects on top. Little explained: "Bryan would then vamp on the keyboard and produce what he called a 'moody synth' sound, which was like a pad sound with plenty of movement and character. That would enable him to get a lot of feeling out of a couple of chords, and Duran Duran did the same thing." Using the method, the group yielded what author Steve Malins called several "embryonic ideas", a demo of "Union of the Snake" and an unreleased track titled "Seven and the Ragged Tiger", parts of which evolved into "The Seventh Stranger". According to John, sketches of the tracks "Of Crime and Passion", "(I'm Looking for) Cracks in the Pavement", "I Take the Dice" and "Spidermouse", which became "New Moon on Monday", were devised during their time in France.

Caribbean sessions

As a means to increase concentration amid tabloid scrutiny and paparazzi bombardment, Duran Duran relocated to George Martin's AIR Studios on the Caribbean island of Montserrat to resume recording. In his memoir, John says the group viewed a BBC documentary chronicling the recording of the Police's Synchronicity (1983) at AIR and felt it would be a good fit for Duran Duran. EMI, believing Little's inexperience as a producer was slowing down progress, brought in Alex Sadkin, the mixer of "Is There Something I Should Know?", to replace Little before Sadkin intervened, finding Little was important to the band's writing process. Little later said he contributed several ideas despite not receiving any writing credits on the finished album.

Duran Duran spent five to six weeks recording in Montserrat, engineered by Peter Wade-Schwier. Tracks produced at AIR included "The Reflex" and "Union of the Snake" by mid-June 1983, as well as the chorus of "New Moon on Monday". Chic backing vocalists Michelle Cobbs and B. J. Nelson were flown in from New York City to provide backing vocals for "The Reflex". The group's time at AIR proved irritating due to encountering both personal and technical problems, such as tape machines that failed to run at the correct speeds; the production crew were passed off as whiny and unprofessional when they complained to the local studio engineers. The band's massive success led to rising tensions between the members due to inflated egos and the presence of girlfriends. Additionally, keyboardist Nick Rhodes collapsed one day and had to be airlifted to a hospital in Miami, Florida after suffering from paroxysmal tachycardia, or an abnormally fast heartbeat. With a deadline of a Christmas release, the band members were worried the album would not be delivered on time. 

On 20 July 1983, Duran Duran briefly halted the sessions to play at the Prince's Trust concert with Dire Straits at the Dominion Theatre in London, with Prince Charles and Princess Diana in attendance. Having not performed live in several months, Duran Duran were under-rehearsed, leading to a poor performance amidst technical problems, but spoke briefly with the royal couple afterwards. A photograph taken of Diana with singer Simon Le Bon, John and Andy made headlines the following day. Three days later, the band played a charity concert at Aston Villa's football stadium, Villa Park, in Birmingham before returning back to Montserrat.

Upon their return to Montserrat, Duran Duran supporter Steve Sutherland of Melody Maker visited the sessions to check on progress. According to Malins, the band played him eight new songs "in various states of disarray". Sutherland predicted "Union of the Snake" would be the first single, while opining that "['The Reflex'] is sharper and more brutal than anything they've recorded before". The writer was informed by Sadkin that the album was far from completion amidst the studio's technical problems. Sadkin had a hard time producing the record overall and later said he was surprised at how little material the band had.

Australian sessions
With tensions rising in Montserrat, Duran Duran changed recording locations again, settling in Sydney, Australia at the end of August 1983 as they felt their relationship with the country was special following their previous tours and commercial success there. Throughout September, the band recorded and mixed the rest of the album, now called Seven and the Ragged Tiger, at Studios 301. The studio was reportedly inferior to AIR, but superior to the mobile studio in France; the producers found technical problems could be resolved easier. Phil Thornalley, Sadkin's personal engineer, assumed the role for these sessions.

With the majority of the rhythm tracks cut, the band used 301 to record lyrics, synthesiser and guitar overdubs, and Andy Hamilton's saxophone parts. Le Bon, suffering from writer's block, composed melody lines after listening back to the rhythm parts and wrote lyrics based on those later. Little felt that he was the "least involved" and the "least active" of the five members. Rhodes used a new Fairlight CMI digital sampling synthesiser to help change the band's sound, as he wanted Seven to be a more "sophisticated pop album full of minutiae and multiple textures".

Other members also experimented during the sessions: John utilised a different technique for his bass playing, playing fewer notes as a way to "get more feel" out of the instrument; drummer Roger Taylor worked with Sadkin to create a more natural sound compared to the "machine-like, rigid beats" of the first two albums; and Andy used a more melodic style of playing compared to his, in Malins' words, "usual cut-and-thrust". Rafael de Jesus and Mark Kennedy contributed percussion, which Malins felt created a "more exciting, dynamic foundation for the songs". The tracks went through different versions regularly. At this point, the members grew tired of the album's long recording process and tensions rose over its direction. Andy later described its recording as a "laborious plod", while Rhodes said:

Sadkin and Rhodes discarded several of the rhythm tracks during mixing and received backlash from John and Andy over rerecording their parts. Reflecting in his memoir, John acknowledged the period as the beginning of a split in the band that only grew worse over the next year. Alongside growing tensions in the studio, the players were forced to relocate from their hotels due to bombardment from fans. Rhodes and Sadkin ultimately worked 15-hour days with Little to mix Seven and the Ragged Tiger, extending into October 1983. By the time the first single, "Union of the Snake", was being mixed, Rhodes and Sadkin only had 24 hours to write and record its B-side, "Secret Oktober", which Malins describes as a "moody electronic-carousel".

Music and lyrics
Commentators have recognised Seven and the Ragged Tiger as a departure from Duran Duran's previous albums. Richard Buskin of Sound on Sound observed more of a "synth-dance sound", while author Annie Zaleski wrote that Seven is "indebted less to guitar-driven post-punk and more the sleeker synth-pop sounds popular at the time". Writing for AllMusic, Mike DeGagne found that the album's content has the band "moving ever so slightly into a danceclub arena", with "their ability to produce a sexier sound" favouring electronics and instrumentation over "a firm lyrical and musical partnership". Malins agrees, referring to Seven as a "very detailed, technology-based record".

AllMusic's Stewart Mason described the opening track, "The Reflex", as sounding like "an underwritten exercise in art-funk", drawing comparisons to Rio "Hold Back the Rain". "New Moon on Monday" and "Union of the Snake" showcase the band's influences: the former boasts an echo of Roxy Music, while the latter was based on the bass drum pattern for David Bowie's "Let's Dance" (1983). Malins finds the up-tempo tracks "Of Crime and Passion" and "Shadows on Your Side" evoke feelings of insomnia and hysteria. Davis describes "(I'm Looking for) Cracks in the Pavement" as sounding like an homage to the Police with a "carnival vibe". Seven also features an atmospheric, electronic-based instrumental called "Tiger Tiger", dubbed by Davis a "pastoral drone, evoking a jungle painted by Rousseau with hidden tribes playing rattles and sticks". The final track, "The Seventh Stranger", Malins and Davis deem a "moody finale" and a "tepid ballad", respectively.

Le Bon described Seven as "an adventure story about a little commando team". The album's lyrics are ambiguous and cover a variety of topics, including the dark side of fame the band were experiencing ("Shadows on Your Side"), living based on instinct ("The Reflex"), being pulled by an undertow ("Of Crime and Passion") and changing identities as a means of escape ("The Seventh Stranger"). According to Malins, most of the tracks, particularly "Union of the Snake", "I Take the Dice", "Shadows on Your Side" and "(I'm Looking for) Cracks in the Pavement", portray a character in a "manic, slightly deranged state". In "Union of the Snake", the words visualise a dreamlike revolution led by music, and "New Moon on Monday" presents a character's attempt to flatter a shy potential lover. Davis says the lyrics took influence from Le Bon's relationship uncertainties and "romantic ambivalences" with his then-girlfriend.

Title and packaging
The album's title was devised by Le Bon and taken from the unreleased track of the same name. The "seven" refers to the five band members and their two managers, while the "ragged tiger" is success: "Seven people running after success. It's ambition. That's what it's about." Rhodes disliked the title, stating in 1983: "It seems to me like the name of a kids' book, not so much the Famous Five, more sort of piratey." According to Malins, the keyboardist still refers to the LP simply as "the third album".

The album cover was shot at the State Library of New South Wales during a lavish photoshoot with photographer Rebecca Blake. Sleeve designer Malcolm Garrett was flown in from the UK, as well as a live Bengal tiger from Melbourne to be pictured on both the album cover and upcoming tour programme. Surrounded by crew members, local journalists, TV cameramen and fans, Duran Duran were dressed in all-black attire: Rhodes donned a "black lizard suit", John and Roger in "evening dress", while Le Bon and Andy wore suede and leather; John later quipped in his memoir that "we all looked like successful young men". The shoot reportedly cost upwards of £65,000. 

According to Paul Berrow, the plan was to shoot a promo in Kashmir involving the tiger but Andy and Rhodes vetoed the idea. Another idea involving the use of smoke bombs was scrapped when the tiger was spooked by them. Garrett's final sleeve design solely features the tiger's eye and a small portion of its fur. Against the caramel-coloured artwork are various logos, including the band's new DD logo, a crescent moon, a triple-X glyph and a Chinese-style antique map depicting snowy mountains and rivers; Davis says this represents the trips Duran Duran ventured on during their upcoming tour. Malins finds the map suggests secrets that are waiting to be unfolded, offering a visual representation of Le Bon's "soul-searching on the album through [the] admittedly ambiguous lyrics".

Release and singles
The music video for "Union of the Snake", featuring the band members in a cave with serpent-like dancers and Le Bon as a Mad Max-type road warrior, was sent to MTV by Capitol a full week before the single was set to release to radio, drawing backlash from radio stations who found the move unfair. The band expressed distaste for the video. Upon its release as a single on 17 October 1983, "Union of the Snake" peaked at number three in both the UK and the US. Following the number one debut of "Is There Something I Should Know?", the group's failure to hit number one led some critics to conclude Duran Duran had hit their peak.

The simultaneous worldwide release of Seven and the Ragged Tiger followed a month later on 21 November 1983, shortly after the band commenced a worldwide tour. It entered the UK Albums Chart at number one, becoming the band's first album to top the chart, although sales fell off quicker than EMI had expected. When it debuted on the US Billboard Top LPs & Tape chart, both Rio and the reissued Duran Duran were still high on the chart. It reached number eight and within months achieved platinum status with sales of one million units, eventually going double platinum. Elsewhere, Seven and the Ragged Tiger topped the chart in the Netherlands and reached number two in Australia, three in Finland, seven in Canada, 11 in Austria and New Zealand, 12 in Italy, 14 in Norway, 16 in Switzerland, 17 in Germany and 19 in Sweden.

"New Moon on Monday" was issued as the second single on 14 January 1984, backed by "Tiger Tiger". Its ambitious video, directed by Mulcahy's colleague Brian Grant, contained images of a medieval French town and was shot during a two-day shoot in Paris before the tour resumed in Japan. Hated by the band members, the video received heavy airplay on MTV. The single itself stalled at number nine in the UK and number ten in the US. With both singles performing below the label's expectations, EMI executives grew concerned that Sadkin lacked the skill to produce a great single for Duran Duran.

While in Australia on tour, John heard a prerelease copy of the INXS single "Original Sin", produced by Chic member Nile Rodgers and engineered by Jason Coruso, and felt a remix of "The Reflex" would perform well as a single. For the remix, Rodgers made the song more dance-oriented, adding looping vocals, additional percussion, increased the tempo and cut the runtime. It initially received backlash from EMI and Capitol, who felt it was "too black" for Duran Duran. Executives were eventually convinced and upon release as the third single on 16 April 1984, the remixed song became the band's first US and second UK number one single. Its success boosted sales for Seven and the Ragged Tiger five months after its release. The single's accompanying video was shot by Mulcahy over two days at the Maple Leaf Gardens in Toronto; John wanted the video to be taken from a live show as a way to showcase their strength as a live band and to dismiss interviewers who referred to Duran Duran solely as a "video band".

Critical reception

Reviews for Seven and the Ragged Tiger were predominantly negative upon its release. Critics cited poor lyrics and found the group utilised their musical influences in unoriginal ways. Record Mirror Jim Reid, in particular, felt the record marked the first chapter in the band's decline, deeming the music "no more than a sub-art school mix of plagiarism" and the lyrics "chickenfeed mysteries that neither say or mean anything". Reid ultimately found the LP "bad as in pathetic, useless, no good" and a "painful [listening] experience" that showcases the group's "mediocre talent". Ira Robbins was also negative in Trouser Press, describing Seven as "a harmless, useless mishmash of old riffs and weak songs" that represents a step backward from Rio. He argued the band were "too talented to be satisfied with such a dismal showing". In an extremely negative review, Sounds dubbed the record "Seven and the Rancid Ravings", arguing that it is "so assuredly awful it breaks new ground in badness", and concluding: "Seven is more redolent of illness – a nervous disorder of people near to cracking up – than it is of just being an amusingly dreadful recording." In NME, Paolo Hewitt argued that pop stars are only interested in themselves, with Duran Duran being "perhaps the most striking example", criticising the lyrics as "attempting to add drama and shade" to the material's "already weak structures".

Amongst positive reviews, Melody Maker Michael Oldfield found the album a bold move at this stage of the band's career, in which they solidify the 1980s dancefloor sound and simultaneously put an end to their "wimpish image". He also said that Seven "restores danger and menace to a band that was veering dangerously close to the insipid". Billboard acknowledged a refinement in the style exhibited on prior works that equated to a "well-crafted set" that "yields fresh bursts of their now familiar choral sound, more playful eroticism and plenty of dance-oriented rhythmic momentum for their club fans", giving particular recognition to the production. Peter Martin of Smash Hits wrote: "The arrangements are watertight, the melodies are razor-sharp and every number is drenched with the mystique of a James Bond theme. A classy concoction, it should ensure they'll be around for quite a while yet." In a more mixed review, Robert Christgau of The Village Voice stated that "as public figures and maybe as people, these imperialist wimps are the most deplorable pop stars of the post-punk if not post-Presley era," calling the lyrics "obtuse at best," and said "if you'd sooner listen to a machine sing than Simon Le Bon, what are you going to do with both?" However, he praised the album's singles as being "twice as pleasurable as anything Thomas Dolby is synthesizing these days".

Tour

To support Seven and the Ragged Tiger, Duran Duran embarked on a world tour that covered shows in Australia, Japan, England, the US and Canada. Dubbed the Sing Blue Silver Tour after a lyric in Rio "The Chauffeur", the tour was documented by a film crew, directed by Mulcahy. It commenced in Canberra, Australia in mid-November 1983 before returning to the UK for concerts in London in early December. The short Japanese leg of seven dates occurred throughout mid-to-late January 1984. In Japan, Duran Duran played at larger venues than they were used to; audiences screamed so loud they could not hear themselves play. Throughout the tour, the ensemble displayed a harder and heavier sound compared to the supporting album. Roger stated: "The guitar is more upfront. We go for more power and everyone projects a lot. It's basically a rock show. We're not a synthesiser band."

The North American leg commenced at the end of January; according to Malins, the band members were on an "adrenaline-charged 'voyage of discovery. While on the road in February, the band won two Grammy Awards in the new Best Long Form and Best Short Form music video categories, and appeared on the cover of Rolling Stone magazine, who dubbed them the "Fab Five" in comparison to the Beatles. 

The tour was massively successful, including through the selling of merchandise, but the non-stop touring schedule took a toll on the band members by the end of February. The cold weather, constant use of drugs and alcohol and presence of girlfriends led to increased tensions and fights amongst the players. According to Malins, inflated egos led to rampant behavior, particularly from Andy. In March, Duran Duran continued playing in the northeastern US and Canada before playing two sold-out shows at Madison Square Garden, achieving a goal they had made when they signed to EMI in 1981.

The Sing Blue Silver Tour continued around the US, concluding in San Diego in mid-April. By the final dates, John was doing drugs on stage. Footage from the shows in Oakland, California were compiled for the concert film Arena (1985). A planned European leg was cancelled due to the band's exhaustion. It was the final tour of the 1980s with the original lineup. At its end, the band filmed more material for Arena using studio sets; the film was released in late 1984 along with a documentary about the tour, titled Sing Blue Silver; an edited one-hour cut of Arena, titled As the Lights Go Down, was broadcast on several US channels. Live recordings from across the tour and a new studio song, the Rodgers-produced "The Wild Boys", were compiled and released in late 1984 on a live album, also titled Arena.

Legacy

Seven and the Ragged Tiger was Duran Duran's final studio album with the original five-piece lineup until 2004's Astronaut. After recording "The Wild Boys", the band members mostly collaborated on different projects from 1984 to 1985: Andy and John formed the supergroup the Power Station with singer Robert Palmer and former Chic drummer Tony Thompson, while Le Bon, Rhodes and Roger recorded a studio album, So Red the Rose (1985), as Arcadia. Duran Duran briefly regrouped to record the title song of the James Bond film A View to a Kill (1985) before Andy and Roger departed the band shortly before the recording of their Rodgers-produced fourth studio album Notorious (1986).

In later decades, Seven and the Ragged Tiger continues to receive mixed reactions. In a retrospective review, DeGagne found Seven fails to match the "unrestrained pop/rock ebullience" of Rio with weaker songwriting, as well as favouring synthesisers over Andy's guitar stylings, but still displays strong singles and enough musicality to equal a "bright, energetic and effectual" record. Writing for The Daily Telegraph, Thomas H. Green described Seven as "opulently produced", with "their new romantic origins blooming into lush decadent pop". Chris Gerard found the album more uneven in Metro Weekly but argued Seven predicted the musical direction of both So Red the Rose and Notorious. Writing in 2009, Pitchfork Tom Ewing referred to Seven as a disappointment compared to Rio.

In his biography of the band, Malins contends that the album's primary flaw is a "lack of punch and power", and its "frenzied, chaotic bluster" lacks the effectiveness of Rio. In his book Please Please Tell Me Now, Davis opines that good lyrics were "hard-earned" as Le Bon's "beatnik muse" had vanished. The band as a whole were not satisfied with the album musically. John, in particular, felt Seven was anticlimactic after Rio, writing in his memoir: "Seven and the Ragged Tiger is a beautifully textured record, but it didn't hit you viscerally in the way the earlier albums had."

EMI re-released Seven and the Ragged Tiger in 2010 in two configurations: a two-disc digipak and a three-disc box set, boasting two CDs and one DVD, which included the first official release of the As the Lights Go Down video. Like the reissue of their debut released the same year, the remastering had a negative reaction from fans as a victim of the loudness war. Andy, who had left the band by that point, criticised the remaster, saying that it "sounds like it was done down the pub" and condemned EMI for promoting the demos as bonus tracks: "They should be gifting them to fans after 30 years of support...shame on all involved". EMI refused to recall the reissue because complaints about its sound quality were "by far in the minority".

Track listing
All songs written and composed by Simon Le Bon, Andy Taylor, John Taylor, Roger Taylor and Nick Rhodes.

Side one
 "The Reflex" – 5:29
 "New Moon on Monday" – 4:16
 "(I'm Looking For) Cracks in the Pavement" – 3:38
 "I Take the Dice" – 3:18
 "Of Crime and Passion" – 3:50

Side two
 "Union of the Snake" – 4:20
 "Shadows on Your Side" – 4:03
 "Tiger Tiger" – 3:20
 "The Seventh Stranger" – 5:24

Personnel
Credits adapted from AllMusic:

Duran Duran
 Simon Le Bon – lead vocals
 Andy Taylor – guitar
 John Taylor – bass 
 Roger Taylor – drums
 Nick Rhodes – keyboards

Additional musicians
 Andy Hamilton – soprano and tenor saxophone
 Rafael de Jesus – percussion
 Mark Kennedy – percussion
 Michelle Cobbs – backing vocals on "Union of the Snake" and "The Reflex"
 B. J. Nelson – backing vocals on "Union of the Snake" and "The Reflex"

Production
 Alex Sadkin – producer
 Ian Little – associate producer
 Duran Duran – associate producers
 Phil Thornalley – recording and mixing engineer
 Peter Wade-Schwier – recording engineer
 Jim Taig – tape operator
 Malcolm Garrett – graphic design
 Keith Breeden – illustration

Charts

Weekly charts

Year-end charts

Certifications and sales

Notes

References

Sources

External links
 

1983 albums
Albums produced by Alex Sadkin
Capitol Records albums
Duran Duran albums
EMI Records albums
Albums recorded at AIR Studios